Dirden is a surname. Notable people with the surname include:

 Brandon J. Dirden (born 1978), American actor
 Charles Dirden III (born 1970), American actor and comedian
 Johnnie Dirden (born 1954), American football player

See also
 Darden (disambiguation)
 Durden